is a large thermal power station operated by JERA in the city of Taketoyo, Aichi. Japan. The facility is located at the northern end of Chita Peninsula.

History
Plans to build a power station in Taketoyo were drawn up in the late 1950s by Chubu Electric to meet base load demand, and a site was selected on reclaimed land on the west coast of Kinuura Bay (and inlet of Mikawa Bay), approximately 40 kilometers south of the city of Nagoya. Unit 1, with a 220 MW steam turbine, went on line in 1966. The remaining three units came on line in 1972, and served to power the cities of Aichi Prefecture.

Plans were made to close the facility by the mid-2000s due to rising fuel and maintenance costs. Unit 1 was decommissioned in March 2002, and plans were considered to either close Unit 2, or to convert it from oil to coal. However, with the indefinite shutdown of the Hamaoka Nuclear Power Plant in May 2011 due to the 2011 Tōhoku earthquake and tsunami and Fukushima Daiichi nuclear disaster, Unit 2 was restarted on July 31, 2011. On February 6, 2015, a replacement plan was announced to abolish the old oil-fired power generation facilities and to install high-efficiency coal-fired units instead. Units 2-4 were decommissioned on March 31, 2016. However, since carbon dioxide emissions are significantly higher for coal than for LNG combined cycle power generation, concerns about adverse environmental effects and the impact to global warming led to public opposition. Therefore, Chubu Electric decided to use wood biomass fuel (wood pellets) together with coal to reduce the environmental impact.

Unit 5 started construction on April 18, 2018 and is scheduled to come on line by the end of March 2022. The planned capacity of Unit 5 after the completion is 1070 MW. 

In April 2019, all thermal power plant operations of Chubu Electric Power were transferred to JERA, a joint venture between Chubu Electric and TEPCO Fuel & Power, Inc, a subsidiary of Tokyo Electric Power Company.

Taketoyo Thermal Power Station also had an experimental commercial solar power facility, called "Mega-Solar". Consisting of 36,918 solar panels covering an area of 120,000 square meters, the facility produces 7.5 MW of power, and came on line on October 31, 2011. This was dismantled in October 2015 to make way for the construction of coal/biomass-fired Unit 5 and was relocated to Kawagoe Power Station in Mie Prefecture.

Plant details

See also 

 Energy in Japan
 List of power stations in Japan

References

External links
JERA official home page 

Buildings and structures in Aichi Prefecture
1966 establishments in Japan
Energy infrastructure completed in 1966
Coal-fired power stations in Japan
Biofuel power stations in Japan
Taketoyo
Chubu Electric Power